The Dwingeloo Radio Observatory is a single-dish radio telescope near the village of Dwingeloo in the northeastern Netherlands. Construction started in 1954, and the telescope was completed in 1956. The radio telescope has a diameter of 25 m. At the time of completion it was the largest radio telescope in the world, but it was overtaken in 1957 by the  Lovell Telescope.

As of 2000, it was no longer in operation in an official capacity. Since August 2009, the radio telescope has been a national heritage site (rijksmonument). The telescope dish was removed for restoration in June 2012. The "C.A. Muller Radio Astronomy Station" foundation ("CAMRAS" for short) restored the telescope to working order. The dish was remounted in November 2012.

Radio amateurs along with amateur and professional astronomers, use the telescope for projects, one being Earth–Moon–Earth communication, also known as moonbounce, which allows for people on different parts of Earth to communicate via the Moon. In this technique, radio wave signals are aimed at the Moon by one location, bounce off the Moon's surface, and are detected by an antenna at a different location on Earth. The technique of "visual moonbounce", where the digital representation of an image is moonbounced at amateur-radio frequencies, has been developed at the Dwingeloo Telescope. It was later used in the art project "OPTICKS" by interdisciplinary artist Daniela de Paulis

The radio telescope is owned by ASTRON, the Netherlands Institute for Radio Astronomy. The site of the Dwingeloo Radio Observatory also houses most of the staff of ASTRON and a test site for the Low Frequency Array radio telescope, LOFAR.

Two galaxies are named after this telescope: Dwingeloo 1 and Dwingeloo 2.

References

External links

 
 

Astronomical observatories in the Netherlands
Buildings and structures completed in 1956
Radio telescopes
Rijksmonuments in Drenthe
Westerveld